Angelina Nikolayevna Turenko (born 16 December 1988) is a Russian figure skating coach and former competitor. She is the 2003 Coupe Internationale de Nice champion.

Personal life 
Turenko was born on December 16, 1988 in Leningrad. In the fall of 2020, she married Italian chef, Giovanni Ricciardella. The couple currently live in Egna.

Career 
Turenko won gold at the 2003 Coupe Internationale de Nice, having placed first in both segments ahead of Vanessa Gusmeroli of France. She finished 8th at the 2004 World Junior Championships in The Hague, Netherlands.

She retired from competitive skating following the 2005-06 figure skating season.

Coaching Career 
After retiring from competition, Turenko began coaching in Saint Petersburg. 

In 2021, she began coaching at the Young Goose Academy in Egna, Italy alongside Lorenzo Magri.

Her current and former students include:
  Anastasiia Gubanova
  Nikol Gosviani
  Elizaveta Nugumanova
  Serafima Sakhanovich
  Daniel Grassl
  Gabriele Frangipani
  Ekaterina Kurakova
  Jari Kessler
  Tomàs-Llorenç Guarino Sabaté
  Barbora Vrankova
  Naoki Rossi
  Vladimir Samoilov
  Vivien Papp
  Morisi Kvitelashvili
  Júlia Láng
  Daria Afinogenova
  Tobia Oellerer

Programs

Competitive highlights

References

External links 
 
 Angelina Turenko at Tracings.net

1988 births
Russian female single skaters
Living people
Figure skaters from Saint Petersburg
Place of birth missing (living people)